John Willinsky  (born 1950) is a Canadian educator, activist, and author. Willinsky is currently on the faculty of the Stanford Graduate School of Education where he is the Khosla Family Professor. He is a Fellow of the Royal Society of Canada and directs the Public Knowledge Project.

Biography
Born in Toronto, Ontario, Willinsky taught school in Ontario for 10 years and, with Vivian Forssman, developed the Information Technology Management program for high schools in British Columbia and Ontario. He is the author of Empire of Words: The Reign of the OED and of Learning to Divide the World: Education at Empire's End, which won Outstanding Book Awards from the American Educational Research Association and History of Education Society, as well as the more recent titles, Technologies of Knowing, If Only We Knew: Increasing the Public Value of Social Science Research and The Access Principle: The Case for Open Access to Research and Scholarship—the latter of which won the 2006 Blackwell's Scholarship Award and the 2005 Computers and Composition Distinguished Book Award.

Until 2007 he was the Pacific Press Professor of Literacy and Technology and Distinguished University Scholar in the Department of Language and Literacy Education at the University of British Columbia (UBC). Prior to that, he was an associate professor of education at the University of Calgary. He is a Fellow of the Royal Society of Canada.

Willinsky also directs the Public Knowledge Project, which is researching systems that hold promise for improving the scholarly and public quality of academic research. In October 2009 he was awarded an honorary Doctor of Laws degree from SFU for his contribution to scholarly communication.

Publishing history
Empire of Words: The Reign of the OED
Learning to Divide the World: Education at Empire's End -won Outstanding Book Awards from the American Educational Research Association and History of Education Society
Technologies of Knowing
If Only We Knew: Increasing the Public Value of Social Science Research
The Access Principle: The Case for Open Access to Research and Scholarship
The Intellectual Properties of Learning: A Prehistory from Saint Jerome to John Locke

See also 
 Open Access movement

References

External links
 John Willinsky, Stanford faculty listing
 PKP Homepage, Public Knowledge Project Homepage (under Willinsky's direction)
.  Full text (PDF) is available.

1950 births
Living people
Activists from Toronto
Algoma University alumni
Canadian activists
Fellows of the Royal Society of Canada
Open access activists
Stanford Graduate School of Education faculty
Academic staff of the University of British Columbia